Shyqyri Rreli (18 May 1930 – 31 December 2019) was an Albanian football player who spent the majority of his career with Dinamo Tirana, having previously played for KF Erzeni and Puna Tirana, which is the modern day KF Tirana. As a coach, he was most noted for being in charge of the Albania national team between 1982 and 1985, and again between 1988 and 1989. He has also managed Albania U21, 17 Nëntori, Teuta Durrës and Shkumbini Peqin.

Playing career

Club
A relatively successful forward for KF Erzeni, Puna Tirana, and Dinamo Tirana in the 1950s, he won four league titles with Dinamo Tirana.

International
He made his debut for Albania in a September 1957 friendly match away against China, his sole international game

Managerial career
Rreli peaked as a coach of Albania national under-21 football team, which he led to two straight titles of the Balkan Youth Championship (in 1978 and 1981) and to the quarter finals of the Euro 1984, where Albania U21 was among the best 8 European teams.

As a coach, he won two straight Albania's titles in 1987-88 and 1988-89 with KF Tirana. He led Tirana to the best 16 in three European competitions (1986–87 European Cup Winners' Cup, 1988–89 European Cup, and 1989–90 European Cup). As Albania national football team coach he will be remembered for getting Albania close to qualifying in the Mexico 1986 campaign, most notably through a victory against Belgium and draws against Poland and Greece.

Personal life
He was the father in law of Mirel Josa, another footballer and coach who married Rreli's daughter Brunilda.

Honours
 as a player
Albanian Superliga: 4
 1953, 1955, 1956, 1960

Albanian Cup: 3
 1953, 1954, 1960

 as manager
Albanian Superliga: 2
 1988, 1989

For his achievements Rreli was awarded in 2007 the Mjeshter i Madh civil medal by then president of Albania Bamir Topi.

References

1930 births
2019 deaths
Footballers from Tirana
Albanian footballers
Association football midfielders
Albania international footballers
KF Erzeni players
KF Tirana players
FK Dinamo Tirana players
Albanian football managers
Albania national football team managers
KF Tirana managers
KF Teuta Durrës managers
Shkumbini Peqin managers